is a Japanese electronics company, specializing in public address systems, intercom systems, microphones, array speakers and megaphones. The company's products are used in a variety of settings, among them Brompton Oratory, a large neo-classical Roman Catholic church in Knightsbridge, London.
Their speaker systems are also used in the Al Fateh Grand Mosque, located in the Kingdom of Bahrain.

References

External links

TOA Corporation  
 TOA Corporation 
 TOA Corporation 
 TOA partner at Vietnam 
 Phân phối âm thanh TOA chính hãng 

Audio equipment manufacturers of Japan
Companies based in Hyōgo Prefecture
Loudspeaker manufacturers
Microphone manufacturers
Companies listed on the Tokyo Stock Exchange
Electronics companies established in 1949
Japanese companies established in 1949
Japanese brands